Erika Brown may refer to:
 Erika Brown (curler)
 Erika Brown (swimmer)

See also
 Erica Brown, American writer and educator